The Tacloban Fighting Warays are a professional women's volleyball team in the Premier Volleyball League (PVL). The team, sponsored by Chooks-to-Go, debuted in the 2018 PVL Reinforced Conference.

Current roster 
For the 2018 Premier Volleyball League Open Conference:

Coaching staff
 Head Coach: Ernesto Pamilar
 Assistant Coach: Roberto Javier Patcharee Sangmuang

Team Staff
 Team Manager: 
 Trainer: Alegrio Carpio

Medical Staff
 Team Physician:
 Physical Therapist: Ariel dela Cruz

Previous roster 

Coaching staff
 Head Coach: Ernesto Pamilar
 Assistant Coach: Roberto Javier Patcharee Sangmuang

Team Staff
 Team Manager: 
 Trainer: Alegrio Carpio

Medical Staff
 Team Physician:
 Physical Therapist: Ariel dela Cruz

Coaching staff
 Head Coach: Ernesto Pamilar
 Assistant Coach: Alegrio Carpio

Team Staff
 Team Manager: 
 Trainer: Roberto Javier

Medical Staff
 Team Physician:
 Physical Therapist: Ariel dela Cruz

Honors

Imports

Team captains 
  Jovielyn Grace Prado (2018)

Coaches 
  Ernesto "Nes" Pamilar (2018 – 2019†)

Former players 

Local players

 Regine Anne Arocha
 Bangladesh Pantaleon
 Heather Anne Guino-o

Foreign players

 Amporn Hyapha
 Patcharee Sangmuang
 Sasiwimol Sangpan

References 

Women's volleyball teams in the Philippines
2018 establishments in the Philippines